Maria Eliza Pineda Bautista (born August 23, 1995), or better known as Eliza Pineda, is a Filipino actress.

Early career
Pineda is an original talent of ABS-CBN from 2002 to 2017 whose she is also a former child actress in a various acting skills like drama, action and comedy.

Current career
Pineda's appearances include  Mga Anghel na Walang Langit, Maria Flordeluna and Kung Fu Kids.

Pineda moved to GMA Network in 2017 and reunited with former Maria Flordeluna co-star Kyline Alcantara in Kambal Karibal in 2018, with new co-stars Bianca Umali, Miguel Tanfelix and Pauline Mendoza.

She recently seen in a fantasy comedy show Daig Kayo ng Lola Ko in 2019 on GMA Network.

Personal life
She has two sisters named Katrina Pineda and Jacqueline Pineda.

She is not related to Charee Pineda.

Discography

Filmography

Television

Film

References

External links
 

1995 births
Kapampangan people
Living people
Filipino child singers
People from Angeles City
Actresses from Pampanga
Singers from Pampanga
Filipino sopranos
21st-century Filipino women singers
ABS-CBN personalities
Star Magic
GMA Network personalities